Philippine clubs has been competing in Asian-level competitions as early as 1967.

Overview

Participating clubs by tournament
CXL : Cancel, WD : Withdrew, PR1 : Preliminary round 1, PR2 : Preliminary round 2, PO : Playoff round, FR : First round, SR : Second round, R16 : Round of 16, ZSF : Zonal semi-finals, ZFI : Zonal final, IZSF : Inter-zonal semi-finals, QF : Quarter-finals, SF : Semi-finals, RU : Runners-up, W : Winners

Asian Champion Club Tournament (1967–1971)

Asian Club Championship (1985–2002)

Asian Champions League (2002–)

AFC Cup (2004–)

Asian Cup Winners' Cup (1990–2002)

AFC President's Cup (2005–2014)

ASEAN Club Championship (2003, 2005, 2022)

Singapore Cup (1998–2019, 2022)

Menpora Cup (2013)

SingaCup Women Football Championship (2022)

Ho Chi Minh City International Women Football Tournament (2015)

References

Philippine
Football clubs in the AFC Cup